Emil Herzog (born 6 October 2004) is a German road cyclist. He won the junior road race at the 2022 UCI Road World Championships.

Major results

2021
 1st  Time trial, National Junior Road Championships
 2nd Overall Course de la Paix Juniors
1st  Young rider classification
 3rd Overall Aubel–Thimister–Stavelot
1st  Young rider classification
1st Stage 2a (TTT)
 4th Overall Internationale Juniorenrundfahrt
1st  Young rider classification
 8th Time trial, UEC European Junior Road Championships
2022
 UCI Junior Road World Championships
1st  Road race
3rd  Time trial
 National Junior Road Championships
1st  Road race
2nd Time trial
 1st  Overall Grand Prix Rüebliland
1st Stage 1
 1st  Overall Course de la Paix Juniors
 1st  Overall Internationale Cottbuser Junioren-Etappenfahrt
1st Stage 1
 1st Grand Prix West Bohemia
 1st Giro di Primavera
 3rd  Time trial, UEC European Junior Road Championships
 5th Paris–Roubaix Juniors

References

External links

2004 births
Living people
German male cyclists